Hoava is an Oceanic language spoken by 1000–1500 people on New Georgia Island, Solomon Islands. Speakers of Hoava are multilingual and usually also speak Roviana, Marovo, Solomon Islands Pijin, English.

Introduction

History
Hoava is an Austronesian language that is spoken mostly on the island of New Georgia. The island was involved in a series of World War II battles, later named the New Georgia Campaign, which lasted from June 20 to November 3, 1943.

Population
Hoava is an Austronesian language that is spoken in three known locations: Western Province, New Georgia Island, and North Marovo lagoon, but mainly New Georgia Island. According to a 1986 census there are about 2,360 speakers of the language, but as of the 1999 census, the language is spoken by 460 people, suggesting a huge decline in the number of speakers.

Phonology

Consonant inventory
Hoava uses 16 consonants in its phoneme system, .

Vowel inventory 
Hoava uses five vowels: . There is no phonemic distinction of vowel length, although vowels can be lengthened when stressed (Davis 2003). The vowels can be combined into pairs with the weight of two syllables (Davis 2003).

Syllable structure
Hoava has an open syllable structure of (C)V. Two vowels occurring together are counted as two syllables, since they function as such for transitive marking rules (Davis 2003). For many Oceanic languages of the Austronesian family group it is common that words do not end in consonants.

Syntax

Basic word order
In traditional typology Hoava is a verb–subject–object (VSO) language. There are some modifications to this particular pattern for focusing and topicalization purposes (Davis 2003).

Morphology

Reduplication
Reduplication is frequently used in Hoava as a method of word formation, to express intensification, and to form the progressive aspect of a verb (Davis 2003). Reduplication is used to create words denoting entities related to the referent of the source word, either as part of the entity, or having a resemblance to it, or being a metaphorical extension" (Davis 2003). 
  'lost';  'forgot'
  'jump';  'jumping'

Pronouns

Personal pronouns 
Information in the following sections is based on Davis 2003:45-109, unless otherwise stated. Subsequent references give only relevant page numbers and figures.

In Hoava there exist three sets of characteristics in order to distinguish which personal pronoun is to be used. This includes whether the pronoun is first, second or third person; the plurality needed; whether it is singular or plural and whether it is inclusive or exclusive. 

There are a number of extra circumstances and exceptions which are also present when discussing the use of personal pronouns. One specific example of this is the third-person singular form , which is used as an emphatic (forcible) form or used to refer to a particular topic. Speakers of Hoava tend to use  for a more general pronoun.

The third-person pronoun  is used with a dual form created by using the number 'two'  after a plural pronoun. A trial form is also created by using the number 'three' prefix . The dual forms are obligatory whereas trial forms can be replaced by a simple plural.

Forms specific for four people are common when it is significant to know that four people were involved. The number 'four' follows the pronoun with the number prefix added, e.g. . Other numbers can be substituted into a sentence in the same matter. When these dual or numerical forms are used, it is most commonly at the start of a narrative to add the names of the others in the group. This does not include the speaker themselves. These pronoun forms can come before a noun phrase in apposition.

Some other characteristics to note with the use of pronouns in Hoava are that pronouns can be followed by demonstratives and by the restrictive particle ; an example of this can be seen below.

There exist some cases in Hoava in which it is not completely necessary for a pronoun to be present or where exceptions to the use of pronouns exist. Firstly, it is common for the pronoun to be dropped from a sentence completely once it has been made clear who is being referred to, or if it is clear who is being referred to by other information such as object markers. Also, the dropping of pronouns referring to animate objects is predominantly done with first-person singular and plural and second-person plural pronouns in object position, as the object marker on the verb is the same as the pronoun.

Inanimate objects in Hoava do not often have a pronominal reference, a construction which resembles a pronoun to identify the object. However, it is possible to use a pronoun for an inanimate object even though it is rare.

In Hoava there exist no reflexive forms of the pronouns. In order to create the same meaning as a reflexive, the verb  (meaning 'return') is used. "There is no subject or object pronoun used, other than the object marker on the applicative suffix...in any of the sentences elicited with the pule used in this manner." (pg.49) 

As seen in the example above,  has been used with the applicable suffix and the singular exclusive first-person pronoun  to create the meaning of the reflexive form 'I've'. Also, the pronoun is followed by the restrictive particle , which is a characteristic that was mentioned earlier to sometimes occur with the use of pronouns.

The morpheme  can also be used in the instances mentioned above, but rather than performing a reflexive function, it acts as an emphasis that no other people were involved apart from the speaker.

Within the lexicon of Hoava there are some verbs which have an inherent reflexive meaning built in and therefore the use of an extra form which suggests that it is reflexive is not needed. These are verbs which automatically mean performing an action to oneself, such as  'wash oneself' or  'scratch (oneself)'.

Demonstrative pronouns 
In Hoava there exists a three-way spatial differentiation of deixis. This includes proximal, close to the speaker; distal, close to the hearer; and remote, distant for the speaker and the hearer. Of the three sets of demonstratives in Hoava, two sets concern the use of pronouns: a set of long forms that are used as both noun modifiers and as demonstrative pronouns and another set which is restricted to being used only as demonstrative pronouns. An extra set of 'near to hearer' long demonstratives is also used both as a noun modifier and demonstrative pronoun. These sets all have both singular and plural forms which can be used.

These long demonstratives can act as demonstrative pronouns at the beginning of a noun phrase.

An example of the use of long demonstratives is as follows:

Hoava has a set of short demonstratives, which are a group of particles found after the noun head of a noun phrase. They have the noun-modifying function of adding a sense of definiteness and they may also signify tense. They can be used with common nouns, names, and pronouns. 

For example, a short demonstrative follows a personal pronoun:

This other set is used also in questions or as an alternative to the long forms.

Possessive pronouns 
Hoava has a set of possessive pronouns which are used at the head of a noun phrase before the item which is being possessed. They are used in cases of exclusive possession.

Person marking 

Negation 
All of these negative particles are placed before the predicate.

The negator  
The negator  expresses factual negation, whereby the speaker claims that what they are saying is correct. As shown in figure 1.1,  can be used in past and present events. These are asserted to be factual. However, in figure 1.2,  can also be used to indicate future events that are expected to be true. Note that  can both precede and follow the future particle. 

Figure 1.1

Figure 1.2

In figure 1.3,  is placed after the definite article of a nominal predicate:

In cases where a noun phrase is placed before the verb phrase or noun phrase predicate,  is not fronted.

Figure 1.4 

 can also be found within imperative clauses:

The negator  
It is used to emphasise events and states that are not possible, not allowed or which run counter to the usual state of affairs. 

 is used to mark events and states that are not possible due to some factor which prevents their occurrence.

Prohibitions can also use .

Figure 2.2 

 can also be used for hypothetical events that are not generally expected to occur. 

Contradictory statements is often expressed using the phrase , which means 'not so, not as stated'.

The negator  
 which means 'not yet' is a negator used to express the likelihood that an event or state will occur, despite not having taken place yet at the point in time referred to. , like the other negative particles, can be seen to precede the verb phrase.

The modal negator  
 is a modal negative particle which expresses the desire of the speaker that negative consequences of an event do not occur. It is placed immediately before the verb phrase.

Figure 4.1

Numerals
Hoava has a decimal system of numbering (Davis 2003). 

  'one'
  'two'
  'three'
  'four'
  'five'
  'six'
  'seven'
  'eight'
  'nine'
  'ten'

Lexicology

Indigenous vocabulary
  'canoe' 
  'bushknife' 
  'fish' 
  'feast' 
  'now' 
  'make' 
  'one' 
  'come' 
  'follow' 
  'sleep' 
  'did' 
  'river' 
  'be' 
  'where' 
  'go' 
  'child' 
  'see'

Endangerment

Materials
There are not many materials written in Hoava. The only material of outside world access is a guide to grammar by Karen Davis and a storybook, which is only beginning to fall out of use. There are translations of the Bible and stories but not much else is known about surviving materials.

Vitality
According to Ethnologue, Hoava has a 6b (Yellow) endangerment status. "Intergenerational transmission is in the process of being broken, but the childbearing generation can still use the language so it is possible that revitalization efforts could restore transmission of the language in the home" (Lewis 2013). Without intergenerational transfer, main outlet uses will soon be destroyed or fade away while other languages take its place. With the decrease of L1 speakers, the value of the language in the community will only drop until it is no longer applicable to the community. Combined with the low number of speakers, if no action is to take place, Hoava will fade to away into disuse.

References

  

PROX:proximal, close to the speaker
DIST:distal, close to the hearer
REST:restrictive particle
SIM:similative particle
PRP:preposition

Further reading
Crystal, David. Language Death. Cambridge, UK: Cambridge UP, 2000. Print.
Lewis, M. Paul, Gary F. Simons, and Charles D. Fennig (eds.). 2013. Ethnologue: Languages of the World, Seventeenth edition. Dallas, Texas: SIL International. Online version: http://www.ethnologue.com.

Northwest Solomonic languages
Languages of the Solomon Islands
Vulnerable languages